The Venezuela women's national 3x3 team is a national basketball team of Venezuela, administered by the Federación Venezolana de Baloncesto.

It represents the country in international 3x3 (3 against 3) women's basketball competitions.

See also
Venezuela women's national basketball team
Venezuela men's national 3x3 team

References

3x3
Women's national 3x3 basketball teams